The 2016 Grand Prix de Denain was the 58th edition of the Grand Prix de Denain cycle race and was held on 14 April 2016. The race started and finished in Denain. The race was won by Daniel McLay.

General classification

References

2016
2016 in road cycling
2016 in French sport